John S. Samuel (December 24, 1913 – April 1, 2002) was a major general in the United States Air Force.  Samuel was born in St. Louis, Missouri. He attended Beloit College from 1932 to 1935.

Military career
Samuel graduated from the United States Military Academy in 1939. During World War II he served with the 391st Bombardment Group and later was given command of the 322d Bombardment Group. Conflicts he took part in include the Invasion of Normandy, the Allied advance from Paris to the Rhine, the Battle of the Bulge, and the Western Allied invasion of Germany. Following the war he became an instructor at the United States Military Academy and later was assigned to The Pentagon. Later he was given command of Carswell Air Force Base, the 816th Air Division, and helped conduct Operation Dominic I and II. In 1963, he was named director of the U.S. Air Force Office of Special Investigations. Later he was assigned to the Office of the United States Secretary of Defense. His retirement was effective as of August 1, 1972.

Major awards and decorations 
Samuel is the recipient of the following:

References

Notes 

1913 births
2002 deaths
Military personnel from St. Louis
United States Air Force generals
Recipients of the Distinguished Service Medal (US Army)
Recipients of the Silver Star
Recipients of the Legion of Merit
Recipients of the Distinguished Flying Cross (United States)
Recipients of the Air Medal
Recipients of the Croix de Guerre (France)
United States Army Air Forces pilots of World War II
United States Military Academy faculty
United States Military Academy alumni
Beloit College alumni
United States Air Force Office of Special Investigations